Ed Earl Repp (1901–1979) was an American writer, screenwriter and novelist.  His stories appeared in several of the early pulp magazines including Air Wonder Stories, Science Wonder Stories and Amazing Stories.  After World War II, he began working as a screenwriter for several western movies

Works
 Beyond Gravity (August 1929)
The Radium Pool (1949)
 The Stellar Missiles (1949)
 Science-Fantasy Quintette (1953)

Selected filmography
 The Man from Hell (1934)
 The Old Wyoming Trail (1937)
 Outlaws of the Prairie (1937)
 West of Cheyenne (1938)
 Call of the Rockies (1938)
 Saddles and Sagebrush (1943)
 The Vigilantes Ride (1943)
 Trigger Trail (1944)
 Terror Trail (1946)
 Gunning for Vengeance (1946)
 Galloping Thunder (1946)
 The Lone Hand Texan (1947)
 Guns of Hate (1948)
 Challenge of the Range (1949)
 The Pecos Pistol'' (1949)

References
Air Wonder Stories (August, 1929).  Stellar Publishing Corporation.  Illois. p. 114

External links

1901 births
1979 deaths
20th-century American novelists
American male novelists
American science fiction writers
American male screenwriters
American male short story writers
Pulp fiction writers
20th-century American short story writers
20th-century American male writers
20th-century American screenwriters